Guilherme Natan de Lima (born 9 May 1999), commonly known as Lima, is a Brazilian professional footballer who plays as a midfielder for Guarani.

Club career
Born in Chapecó, Santa Catarina, Lima started his career at Avaí before moving to hometown side Chapecoense in 2014. He made his first team debut on 9 February 2017, coming on as a late substitute for Bryan Mascarenhas in a 0–2 away loss against Cruzeiro in the Primeira Liga.

Lima subsequently returned to the youth setup, and was loaned to São Paulo's under-20 squad on 1 March 2018. He returned to Chape in 2019, and was definitely promoted to the main squad for the 2020 campaign.

On 17 July 2020, Lima renewed his contract until 2023. He scored his first senior goal on 11 March of the following year, netting the opener in a 2–1 home win against Avaí.

Career statistics

References

External links
 

1999 births
Living people
People from Chapecó
Brazilian footballers
Association football midfielders
Campeonato Brasileiro Série A players
Campeonato Brasileiro Série B players
Associação Chapecoense de Futebol players
Sportspeople from Santa Catarina (state)